Pictures for Pleasure is the first studio album released by singer/guitarist Charlie Sexton in 1985. The album was the first solo effort by the then 16-year-old musician who had already secured a reputation as a skilled guitarist.

Pictures for Pleasure can best be described as a combination between Sexton's blues rock roots and the more commercially acceptable new wave genre. The album produced the Billboard Hot 100 #17 hit "Beat's So Lonely". The song was featured in the John Hughes film Some Kind of Wonderful.

Reception
Cash Box magazine said "With a rich and roaring vocal typical of Forsey's production, as well as some stinging guitar leads, Charlie Sexton is definitely a musician/performer to be reckoned with. Though still in his teens, the sound is fully mature and Sexton is primed for teen star status."

Track listing
"Impressed" (Steve Krikorian, Robert Wilson) – 4:19
"Beat's So Lonely" (Keith Forsey, Sexton) – 5:10
"Restless" (Sexton, Andrew Williams)– 4:57
"Hold Me" (Little Jack Little, David Oppenheim, Ira Schuster) – 4:27
"Pictures for Pleasure" (Nigel Harrison, Sexton) – 4:56
"Tell Me" (Sexton) – 4:11
"Attractions" (Sexton) – 4:27
"You Don't Belong Here" (Steve Krikorian) – 4:52
"Space" (Mike Chapman, Holly Knight) – 3:27

Personnel
Charlie Sexton - bass, guitar, piano, keyboards, programming, vocals
Merchant Bankers - backing vocals
Arthur Barrow - bass, keyboards, programming
Dave Concors - engineer
Keith Forsey - programming, producer
Mick Guzauski - engineer
Steve Schiff - guitar
Alex Martinez - drums, groupie
Scott Wilk - keyboards
Richie Zito - guitar
Michael Frondelli - mixing

Charts

References

1985 debut albums
Albums produced by Keith Forsey
MCA Records albums
Charlie Sexton albums
New wave albums by American artists